Muthina Kathirika is a 2016 Indian Tamil-language political satire film directed by Venkat and produced by Khushbu. A remake of the successful Malayalam film Vellimoonga (2014), the film stars Sundar C., Poonam Bajwa. Following the completion of Sundar's directorial commitments, the film began production in February 2016.

Plot 
In 1996, a 18-year Muthupandi visits the local police station in Kovilur in Thenkasi for a small issue. He gets a good respect in station as his grandfather was an MLA from ADBD party, which is a national party. Muthupandi realises the worth of politics and foolishly joins the party, without realising that ADBD has no hold in Tamilnadu. He tries to woo his college senior Madhavi, but ends up in a scuffle with supr-senior Ravikumar, and drops all hopes of love.

20 years later, Muthupandi is still unmarried and is the State General Secretary of the meek party. His younger brother is married, has kids and works as Government employee and his younger sister is in college. Content from the family's income from ancestral properties, Muthupandi engages in tricks and tactics to keep his party's name alive with nil funding. His assistant Kumar also tags along with him in hopes of making it big.

Bullet Marudhupandi is the Vice-Chairman of Kovilur Municipality and has been vying for MLA seat for 10 years. Despite being an influential member of ruling MMSK party, he is upset that the seat is always given to coalition parties. He has placed a rubber stamp lady as Chairman as per women reservation, and runs the administration. Vanjinathan, the younger brother of Marudhu is a leading member of opposition MMKK party, and has twice lost from the same constituency. Despite being members of opposite groups they maintain a secret rapport and enjoy monopoly in civil contracts.

Muthupandi meets a young lady Maya and falls in love with her. He goes to meet her parents, and finds out that she is the daughter of his crush madhavi and Ravikumar. Ravikumar, now a Police [Inspector], vows not to marry off Maya to muthupandi.  At the same time General elections are announced for the State. As a revenge for all the tricks pulled on by Muthupandi, Marudhupandi and Vanjinathan arrange for Sanjay, a rich london return NRI to marry Maya on the day of results of the election, as Ravikumar is their distant cousin.
 
Muthupandi meets the State President Gopi in Chennai, and they meet with Saamy, the PA of their National President Sharma. Saamy tells the duo that, Sharma wants to improve the party in the South after the General elections. He offers Muthupandi the option to become an MP of Rajya sabha from Assam and then a central deputy-minister, as Muthupandi knows Hindi. Muthupandi offers to get Gopi's home-seat Tambaram from ruling MMKK party and let him become MLA. Gopi, with desire to become an MP, double-crosses Muthupandi, and meets with the Chief Minister, who is also MMKK President, and gets Kovilur allocated to their party. Muthupandi is shocked at the change, and devises a plan.

Muthupandi challenges to Gopi that he will lose the election, and then go on to become an MP. Gopi convinces a distraught Marudhupandi to work for Muthupandi, and tells him about the MP option and pays him heavily. Despite all of Muthupandi's attempts to lose, the campaign goes on well. Vanjinathan contests for the opponent MMKK party and he also campaigns strongly.

On day of election, Muthupandi wins by 2000 votes and becomes an MLA. Muthupandi reveals to Kumar that the "MP and deputy-minister" plan was a drama arranged by him, to win. At the end of the day, MMKK and MMSK win 118 and 116 seats respectively in 234 member assembly, making muthupandi the decider as he contested from his party's symbol. Meanwhile, Sanjay absconds from the wedding, and Ravikumar is cajoled by his relatives to marry off maya to MLA muthupandi. Ravi agrees without will, and Muthupandi finally marries Maya. MMKK offers Muthupandi Khadi Minister post in the new Cabinet, in exchange for his support to form government. Muthupandi rejects the offer to become Khadi Minister, and offers MMKK his support and tells a surprised Maruthupandi that he has eyes on Revenue Dept, the wealthiest one.

The next day Muthupandi, Maya and Kumar leave for Chennai. Muthupandi has arranged for his brother and sister-in-law to be transferred back to Kovilur, to be with their mother. Sanjay meets Muthupandi and maya when they are going to Madurai airport. He reveals that he was also a hoax planted by muthupandi to marry maya. Muthupandi opens up to Maya and Maya forgives Muthupandi, and they reconcile. Kumar gets a call from the CM office, informing them that Muthupandi has been the appointed as Revenue Department Minister.

Cast 

 Sundar C. as Muthupandi
 Poonam Bajwa as Maya
 Kiran Rathod as Madhavi
 Sathish as Saravanan
 VTV Ganesh as 'Bullet' Marudhu
 Singampuli as 'Theenja Vaai' Vanjinathan
 Ravi Mariya as Ravikumar
 Yogi Babu as "Paavi" Babu
 Sumithra as Muthupandi's mother
 Sriman as Gopi
 Singapore Deepan as Marudhu's Assistant
 George Vishnu as Muthupandi's brother
 Tamilselvi as Muthupandi's sister-in-law
 Krithika Laddu as Saravanan's cousin
 Archana Harish as Valli, Saravanan's sister
 Chitra Lakshmanan as Saamy
 Sivan Srinivasan as Rathnavel
 "Hello" Kandasaamy as Astrologer
 Rahul Thatha as a beggar
 Vaibhav as Sanjay (Guest Appearance)

Production 
In February 2015, director Sundar C announced that he had purchased the remake rights of two Malayalam films, Pandippada (2005) and Vellimoonga (2014) and stated he would act in the latter venture. The project was announced to be produced by Khushbu and directed by Venkat, Sundar C's assistant, while the team tried to bring in Priya Anand for the leading female role but were unsuccessful. Following the release of his directorial venture, Aranmanai 2 (2016), Sundar C began work on the project. Poonam Bajwa was signed on to play the female lead role, while Siddharth Vipin was announced as the film's music composer. Titled as Gundu Kathirikai, Kiran Rathod and Sathish were also added to the cast. The team began filming portions in Southern Tamil Nadu during mid-February 2016. In April 2016, the title was changed as Muthina Kathirika.

Release
The satellite rights of the film were sold to Sun TV (India).

Soundtrack 

Music is composed by Siddharth Vipin and released by Divo.

Critical reception 
Times of India wrote "A remake of the 2014 Malayalam film Vellimoonga, Muthina Kathirika is unapologetic about being a lowest common denominator movie. It is loud, it is crass, and it is somewhat fun, especially in the first half. Director Venkatt keeps things fairly low-key and the small-town setting helps. There is hardly anything at stake, but Venkat keeps the scenes moving, and though the comedy is hardly memorable or new, we are entertained." Behindwoods wrote "Toting up, Muthina Kathirika will appeal to all those who just want to let their hair down and have a few laughs." Rediff wrote "The Malayalam version of the film may have worked but debutant director Venkat’s Muthina Kathirikai is an ordinary attempt with lackluster performances, weak screenplay and an overly enthusiastic cast." Baradwaj Rangan of the Hindu wrote "Frankly, there isn’t much to talk about. A few scattered laughs, maybe."

Notes

References

External links 
 

Tamil remakes of Malayalam films
Films scored by Siddharth Vipin
Indian comedy films
2010s Tamil-language films
2016 films
2016 directorial debut films
2016 comedy films